Lauren Isaac (Cholewinski) (born November 15, 1988 in Pineville, North Carolina) is an American speed skater who has competed since 2007. She grew up in Rock Hill, South Carolina, where she attended Northwestern High School and learned to skate at a roller rink called "Roller Magic". In 2006 her family moved to Salt Lake City, Utah for her to pursue a career in skating. She was named to the U.S. team for the 2010 and 2014 Winter Olympics. In addition to her skating, Isaac also models.

Isaac is currently living is Salt Lake City, Utah with her 2 children

References

 NBCOlympics.com profile
 TeamUSA.org profile
 The Rock Hill Herald Online Article
 Public Intoxication Mugshot

1988 births
Living people
People from Pineville, North Carolina
American female speed skaters
Olympic speed skaters of the United States
Speed skaters at the 2010 Winter Olympics
Speed skaters at the 2014 Winter Olympics
21st-century American women